Qortem Zer’a is a river of the Nile basin. Rising in the mountains of Dogu’a Tembien in northern Ethiopia, it flows westward to empty finally in Weri’i and Tekezé River.

Characteristics 
It is an ephemeral river, mostly meandering in its alluvial plain, with an average slope gradient of 34 metres per kilometre.

Flash floods and flood buffering
Runoff mostly happens in the form of high runoff discharge events that occur in a very short period (called flash floods). These are related to the steep topography, often little vegetation cover and intense convective rainfall. The peaks of such flash floods have often a 50 to 100 times larger discharge than the preceding baseflow.
The magnitude of floods in this river has however been decreased due to interventions in the catchment. Physical conservation structures such as stone bunds and check dams intercept runoff. On many steep slopes, exclosures have been established; the dense vegetation largely contributes to enhanced infiltration, less flooding and better baseflow.

Irrigated agriculture
Besides springs and reservoirs, irrigation is strongly dependent on the river's baseflow. Such irrigated agriculture is important in meeting the demands for food security and poverty reduction. Irrigated lands are established in the alluvial plain along the river, particularly west of Getski Melesiley.

Transhumance towards the gorge

Transhumance takes place in the summer rainy season, when the lands near the villages in the uplands and the lowlands are occupied by crops. Young shepherds will take the village cattle to the slopes at the river headwaters.

Boulders and pebbles in the river bed

Boulders and pebbles encountered in the river bed can originate from any location higher up in the basin. In the uppermost stretches of the river, only rock fragments of the upper lithological units will be present in the river bed, whereas more downstream one may find a more comprehensive mix of all lithologies crossed by the river. From upstream to downstream, the following lithological units occur in the catchment.
 Upper basalt
 Interbedded lacustrine deposits
 Lower basalt
 Amba Aradam Formation
 Adigrat Sandstone
 Edaga Arbi Glacials

From upper to lower Tembien
During its course, this river passes through two woredas. On the various parts:
 The headwaters are in Dogu’a Tembien
 Most of the lower plain is in Kola Tembien

Trekking along the river
Trekking routes have been established across and along this river. The tracks are not marked on the ground but can be followed using downloaded .GPX files.
 Trek 5, along upper part of the river
 Trek S3, along the lower part, potentially down to Tekezé River
In the rainy season, flash floods may occur and it is advised not to follow the river bed. In the lower part, it may be impossible to cross the river in the rainy season.

Gallery

See also 
 List of Ethiopian rivers

References

Rivers of Ethiopia
Dogu'a Tembien
Tigray Region
Nile basin